Ange Paulin Terver (4 October 1798, Lyon – 15 August 1875, Fontaines-sur-Saône) was a French malacologist.

He was a member of the Société linnéenne de Lyon, being curator of its zoological collections from 1849 to 1872. In 1853 he became a member of the Société d'agriculture de Lyon, serving as secretary of the Commission des soies from 1853 to 1868.

His collection of terrestrial and freshwater snails were purchased by the city of Marseille (Musée de Marseille). His family donated his collection of 14000 coquilles to the Muséum de Lyon.

Published works associated with Terver 
 Lithographies XIV-XVI in Complément de l'Histoire naturelle des Mollusques terrestres et fluviatiles de la France par Gaspard Louis André Michaud, (1831).
 Catalogue des mollusques terrestres et fluviatiles, observés dans les possessions françaises au nord de l'Afrique (1839).
 Malacologie lyonnaise, ou, Description des mollusques terrestres & aquatiques des environs de Lyon : d'après la collection Ange-Paulin Terver, donnée au Museum de Lyon par la Famille Terver en 1876, published by Arnould Locard, (1877).

References 

1798 births
1875 deaths
Scientists from Lyon
French malacologists